Evandro is a given name. Notable people with the name include:

Evandro Agazzi (born 1934), Italian philosopher
Evandro Chagas (1905–1940), Brazilian physician and biomedical scientist specializing in tropical medicine
Evandro Soldati (born 1985), Brazilian male model
Evandro (footballer, born 1974), Evandro Carlos Escardalete, Brazilian football forward
Evandro Adauto da Silva (born 1980), Brazilian footballer 
Evandro (footballer, born 1985), Evandro Russo Ramos, Brazilian football forward
Evandro Roncatto (born 1986), Brazilian footballer
Evandro (footballer, born 1986), Evandro Goebel, Brazilian football attacking midfielder
Evandro (footballer, born May 1986), Evandro Silva Resende, Brazilian football striker
Evandro Teixeira Magalhães (born 1986), Brazilian footballer
Evandro Silva do Nascimento (born 1987), Brazilian footballer known as "Evandro Paulista"
Evandro Oliveira (born 1990), Brazilian beach volleyball player
Evandro (footballer, born 1993), Evandro Rodrigues Florêncio, Brazilian football midfielder
Evandro (footballer, born 1997), Evandro da Silva, Brazilian football forward

See also
Evandro Almeida Stadium, usually known as Baenão, a multi-use stadium in Belém, Pará, Brazil
Rocca d'Evandro, a comune in Italy